Belidaphne is a genus of extinct sea snails, marine gastropod mollusks in the family Mangeliidae.

Species
Species within the genus Belidaphne include:
 † Belidaphne brunettii Della Bella, Naldi & Scarponi, 2015 
 † Belidaphne hypoglypta (Fontannes, 1880) 
 † Belidaphne saldubensis Vera-Peláez, 2002

References

 Vera-Peláez, J. L. (2002). Revision de la familia Turridae, excepto Clavatulinae (Gastropoda, Prosobranchia) en el Plioceno de las cuencas de Estepona, Malaga y Velez Malaga (Malaga, S Espana) con la descripcion de 26 especies nuevas. Pliocenica. 2: 176-262

External links
  Della Bella G., Naldi F. & Scarponi D. (2015). Molluschi marini del Plio-Pleistocene dell'Emilia-Romagna e della Toscana - Superfamiglia Conoidea, vol. 4, Mangeliidae II. Lavori della Società Italiana di Malacologia. 26: 1-80